Winchester Clowes (4 October 1876 – 25 February 1940) was a British motorboat racer who competed in the Class A event at the 1908 Summer Olympics.

References

1876 births
1940 deaths
British motorboat racers
Motorboat racers at the 1908 Summer Olympics
Olympic motorboat racers of Great Britain
Sportspeople from London